Steve Piper (2 November 1953 – 26 December 2017) was an English footballer who played as a central defender.

Born in Brighton, Piper joined Brighton and Hove Albion as a youth player and went on to make 162 league appearances for the Seagulls. He then moved on to Portsmouth before joining non-league Worthing. He also played for Littlehampton Town, Southwick, Steyning Town and Whitehawk.

Piper died on 26 December 2017 aged 64.

References

1953 births
2017 deaths
English footballers
Footballers from Brighton
Brighton & Hove Albion F.C. players
Portsmouth F.C. players
Worthing F.C. players
Littlehampton Town F.C. players
Southwick F.C. players
Steyning Town F.C. players
Whitehawk F.C. players
Association football defenders